Durham is an unincorporated community in Hancock County, Illinois, United States.

History
Durham was laid out in 1839. A large share of the early settlers being natives of Durham, Connecticut caused the name to be selected. A post office was established at Durham in 1850, and remained in operation until 1905.

References

Unincorporated communities in Hancock County, Illinois
Unincorporated communities in Illinois